Allan Philip Henri Gutheim (born 13 November 1962) is a Swedish film composer. He was born in the Vantör borough of Stockholm. He composed music for the film  in 1984. With his wife he runs Leksaksland, a toy museum, thought to be the largest private toy collection in Sweden.

References

Living people
Date of birth missing (living people)
Swedish electronic musicians
Directors of museums in Sweden
Swedish composers
Swedish male composers
1962 births